The government of Northern Ireland is, generally speaking, whatever political body exercises political authority over Northern Ireland. A number of separate systems of government exist or have existed in Northern Ireland.

Following the partition of Ireland, Northern Ireland was recognised as a separate territory within the authority of the British Crown on 3 May 1921, under the Government of Ireland Act 1920. The new autonomous Northern Ireland was formed from six of the nine counties of Ulster, being four counties with unionist majorities (Antrim, Armagh, Down and Derry), and Fermanagh and Tyrone two of the five Ulster counties which had nationalist majorities. In large part unionists, at least in the north east region, supported its creation while nationalists were opposed.  Subsequently, on 6 December 1922, the island of Ireland became an independent dominion known as the Irish Free State but Northern Ireland immediately exercised its right to opt out of the new Dominion.

The first government of Northern Ireland was the Executive Committee of the Privy Council of Northern Ireland, which exercised such authority from 1922 to 1972. A Northern Ireland Executive was created following the signing of the Sunningdale Agreement in 1974, while the current Northern Ireland Executive under the First Minister and Deputy First Minister, was created in the Belfast (Good Friday) Agreement, and has intermittently been in existence from 1999 to the present. Northern Ireland has also been governed by ministers under the Secretary of State for Northern Ireland during periods of Direct Rule.

See also 
 Scottish Government
 Governance of England

References

 
History of Northern Ireland